In a variety of contexts endogeneity is the property of being influenced within a system. It appears in specific contexts as:

Endogeneity (econometrics)
Exogenous and endogenous variables in economic models
Endogenous growth theory in economics
Endogenous preferences in economics
Endogenous money
Endogenous depression

See also
Endogeny (biology)
Exogeny